Princess Vichitra Chiraprabha (21 April 1881 – 15 August 1881) was a Princess of Siam (later Thailand). She was a member of the Siamese Royal Family, the daughter of Chulalongkorn.

Her mother was Queen Savang Vadhana, consort and half-sister of King Chulalongkorn (later become Queen Sri Savarindira, the Queen Grandmother). She was the eldest daughter and the third child of King Chulalongkorn and Queen Savang Vadhana together. She was given the full name by her father as Vichitra Chiraprabha Adulyadirekratana Khattiyarajakumari

She died in infancy on 15 August 1881, at the age of 3 months.

Ancestry

References

1881 births
1881 deaths
19th-century Thai royalty who died as children
19th-century Chakri dynasty
Thai female Chao Fa
Children of Chulalongkorn
Daughters of kings